This is a list of seasons of the Swedish Women's Hockey League (SDHL) (formerly named Riksserien) since the league was inaugurated in the 2007–08 season.

Seasons

As Riksserien 
2007–08 |
2008–09 |
2009–10 |
2010–11 |
2011–12 |
2012–13 |
2013–14 |
2014–15 |
2015–16

As Swedish Women's Hockey League 
2016–17 |
2017–18 |
2018–19 |
2019–20 |
2020–21

See also 
Damettan

External links 
 SDHL official website 

Women's ice hockey competitions in Sweden
Women's ice hockey in Sweden
Women's ice hockey leagues in Europe
Ice hockey in Sweden
Women's sports competitions in Sweden
Ice hockey-related lists